Stefan Zinnow (born 28 May 1980) is a German former professional footballer who played as a midfielder.

Career
Zinnow was born in Weinheim. He made his professional debut in the Bundesliga for Eintracht Frankfurt in a match against VfL Bochum on 4 April 1999 when he came on as a substitute in the 9th minute. He was substituted in the 65th minute.

References

1980 births
Living people
Association football midfielders
German footballers
Germany under-21 international footballers
Eintracht Frankfurt players
Eintracht Frankfurt II players
SV Waldhof Mannheim players
VfB Lübeck players
SV Wehen Wiesbaden players
SV Elversberg players
Kickers Offenbach players
SV Sandhausen players
Bundesliga players
2. Bundesliga players
3. Liga players
People from Weinheim
Sportspeople from Karlsruhe (region)
Footballers from Baden-Württemberg